The Bear  Fire is a large wildfire that started near Clifton, Arizona on June 16, 2021. It has so far burned  and is 20% contained.

Events

June 
The Bear Draw Fire was first reported on June 16, 2021, at around 2:00 pm MDT near Clifton, Arizona.

July

Cause 
The cause of the fire is believed to be due to lightning.

Containment 
As of July 17, 2021, the fire is 20% percent contained.

Impact

Closures and Evacuations 
U.S. 191 is closed between mileposts 175 and 250 due to the Bear Fire.

References 

2021 Arizona wildfires
2022 Arizona wildfires
June 2021 events in the United States
July 2021 events in the United States
Wildfires in Arizona